Idstedt is a village in Schleswig-Flensburg district in Schleswig-Holstein, Germany. It is c. 10 km. NNW of the city of Schleswig and east of the Bundesautobahn 7.

On 24–25 July 1850, the Battle of Isted ended the First War of Schleswig.

References

Schleswig-Flensburg